Bolton le Moors (also known as Bolton le Moors St Peter) was a large civil parish and ecclesiastical parish in hundred of Salford in the historic county of Lancashire, England. It was administered from St Peter's Church, Bolton in the township of Great Bolton.

History
Bolton le Moors was originally a part of the ancient parish of Eccles. In the 14th century it became a parish in its own right. It resembled what is now the town of Bolton and some outskirts. As with many large parishes in the north of England, it was split into townships in 1662 for easier civic administration. Some of the townships had chapels and were known as chapelries.

Anglezarke
Blackrod
Bradshaw
Breightmet
Darcy Lever
Edgworth
Entwistle
Great Bolton
Harwood
Little Bolton
Little Lever
Longworth
Lostock
Quarlton
Rivington
Sharples
Tonge with Haulgh
Turton

For civil purposes, these townships and chapelries were largely autonomous.  For ecclesiastical purposes they were presided by and gave an overall precept to the vicar of Bolton. In 1866, the young civil parish (civil parishes in England were set up for almost all parishes from the 1840s to 1860s) was ended; the townships became civil parishes in their own right. These townships, later civil parishes, were used for the censuses until 1891, after which most were absorbed into the County Borough of Bolton or became urban districts. Anglezarke and Rivington became part of the Chorley Rural District.

Anglican parish

The residual ecclesiastical parish exists, being east-central Bolton town centre and a joined-on zone south-west. It is one of the Church of England parishes in the Diocese of Manchester. The parish church is St Peter's Church, Bolton and was rebuilt between 1866 and 1871.

The Reverend Matthew Thompson served from 2008 to 2017.

Notable residents
Thomas Cole (1801–1848), painter and the founder of the Hudson River School.
John Moran (1830–1902), pioneer artistic photographer.
Thomas Moran (1837–1926) painter and printmaker of the Hudson River School.

Demography

References

History of Lancashire
History of Bolton